Lohoodon is a genus of hapalodectid mesonychians which lived during the middle Eocene. Fossils of Lohoodon are found in middle Eocene-aged strata of China and Pakistan.

Species
Genus Lohoodon
L. lushiensis

References

External links
Ancient Nature

Mesonychids
Eocene mammals of Asia
Prehistoric placental genera